Elza is a feminine given name of Hebrew and German origins. A derivation of Elizabeth, and a close variant of the names Elsa, Eliza and Aliza, it is Germanic for "noble".

People
Elza Jeffords (1826–1885), U.S. Representative
Elza Kephart, Canadian film director, producer, writer
Elza Kolodin, Polish pianist
Elza Kungayeva (1982–2000), Chechen woman abducted, beaten, raped and murdered by a Russian Army Colonel
Elza Leimane (born 1984), Latvian ballet dancer
Elza Medeiros (1921–2009), Brazilian Army officer and World War II veteran
Elza Radziņa (1917—2005), Latvian actress
Elza Soares (born 1937), Brazilian samba singer
Elza van den Heever, (born 1979), South African opera singer

Fictional characters
Elza Walker, the beta version of Claire Redfield, the protagonist of the 1998 survival horror video game, Resident Evil 2
Japanese name of Zael, a character from the video game The Last Story
Inferno Queen Elza, a character in the Japanese role-playing game, Brave Frontier
Elza Gray, a character that appeared in Sailor Moon (anime)

References

Elza: Film Review
Elza - Meaning of Elza, What does Elza mean?

Latvian feminine given names